The Tai'an railway station is a railway station of Qinhuangdao–Shenyang high-speed railway located in Tai'an County, Anshan, Liaoning, China.

Railway stations in Liaoning